{{DISPLAYTITLE:C15H22N2O}}
The molecular formula C15H22N2O (molar mass : 246.35 g/mol) may refer to:

 2-Ethyl-5-methoxy-N,N-dimethyltryptamine
 4-HO-EPT
 Levomilnacipran
 4-MeO-MiPT, a psychedelic drug
 5-MeO-DET
 5-MeO-MiPT
 Mepivacaine
 Milnacipran
 Piquindone